The Slovenian Football League was an American football competition in Slovenia, founded in 2009 by the Slovene American Football Association. Each season culminated with the Slovenian Bowl, the national bowl game of Slovenia.

League history

2009–10: The Initiation
The Slovenian national league was founded on 9 October 2009 by the Slovene American Football Association. The first league game in Slovenia was played in the said year and four teams competed that year. Those teams were the Ljubljana Silverhawks, Maribor Generals, Alp Devils, and Gold Diggers.

The final game of the season, the inaugural Slovenian Bowl was played on 26 June 2010, where the Ljubljana Silverhawks defeated Alp Devils 41–0.

2011–2012: The Growth
In the following season, the league added teams from the Croatian Federation of American Football. Those teams were the Zagreb Raiders and Zagreb Thunder.

The next Slovenian Bowl games were played in 2011, 2012 and 2013, where the Ljubljana Silverhawks won the title three times in a row.

Seasons

2009–10

2011

2012

Slovenian Bowl champions

References

American football leagues in Europe
2009 establishments in Slovenia
Sports leagues established in 2009
American football in Slovenia